Reuss may refer to:

Reuss (surname)
Reuss (river) in Switzerland
Reuss (state) or Reuß, several former states or countries in present-day Germany, and the Republic of Reuss
Reuss Elder Line and Reuss Younger Line (House of Reuss), members include:
 At least 45 princes "Heinrich von Reuss"
 Augusta Reuss-Ebersdorf (1757-1831)
 Eleonore, Princess Reuss-Köstritz (1860-1917)

See also
Reus (disambiguation)